Dolenja Lepa Vas is a small settlement in the hills south of Gornje Pijavško in the Municipality of Krško in eastern Slovenia. The area is part of the traditional region of Lower Carniola and is now included in the Lower Sava Statistical Region.

References

External links
Dolenja Lepa Vas on Geopedia

Populated places in the Municipality of Krško